The Australian Schoolboys & U18 rugby union team is the national team for schoolboy rugby union & U18 players in Australia.  Considered to be the pinnacle of schoolboy & U18 rugby in Australia, the team plays in fixtures against other national representative schoolboy teams from around the world. Many players who have played in the Australian Schoolboys team have gone on to further representative careers with Super Rugby franchise teams and the Australian national rugby union team.

Australian Schools Rugby Championships
The Australian Schools Rugby Championships, held to determine the champion state and to select the Australian Schools Rugby team, have taken place every year since 1973. Under the current format, the championships are played in two divisions.

Division I
The Division I Championship is contested by 8 teams:
 QLD I and QLD II
 NSW I and NSW II
 ACT
 VIC
 WA
 Combined States

Each team has a squad of 23 players. The "Combined States" team is composed of players from any state (or territory) not selected for other squads but deemed up to the standard required for Division I. The team winning the Division I Championship is awarded the  Shield, while the runner-up receives the  Plate.

Following the tournament, the Australian Schools Team is selected to represent Australia in 'Test' matches against national Under 18 or schoolboys teams from other countries.

An Australian Schools Barbarians team (previously Australia A Schoolboys prior to 2015) is also chosen. This side was first selected in 1995 and also plays schoolboys teams from other countries, but these matches (usually on Australian soil against incoming teams) are not counted as Australian Schools 'Test' matches.

Division II

The Australian Schools Rugby Union previously held a Division II tournament alongside the main Division I Championship until 2016.

Teams that competed included representative sides from the Northern Territory, South Australia, and Tasmania, but these match-ups were moved to the Gold Coast Rugby Carnival from 2017.

First held in 1979, the Div II competition originally included the state teams from Victoria and Western Australia before those sides moved to Division I in 2010.

There was also a National Indigenous team brought together by the Lloyd McDermott Rugby Development Team, the LMRDT, that competed in Div II from 2002 to 2016.

For the 2014 tournament, Tasmania was replaced by a Victoria II side in the Division II Championship, but Tasmania returned in 2015.

The team winning the Division II Championship was awarded the  Cup, and the runner-up received the  Plate. From 2012 to 2016, a President's XV Team was selected from the Division II players for matches against visiting national schools teams.

Most appearances
Players with nine or more caps:

See also

 Ireland national schoolboy rugby union team
 New Zealand national schoolboy rugby union team

References

External links
 
 ASRU International Appearances 1973-2013

High school sports in Australia
Rugby Australia Schoolboys